San Antonio is one of the 142 barangays of Quezon City, Metro Manila, Philippines.

Area and Location 
San Antonio is bounded by the Dario River in the East, Judge Juan Luna Street in the West, Pat Senador and Baler Streets in the south and the Halang Creek in the north. Nearby barangays are Veterans Village (Project 7), Bahay Toro, Bungad, Katipunan, Del Monte and Paltok.

San Francisco del Monte 
San Antonio is a part of the San Francisco del Monte area named after its benevolent Spanish friar and founder, St. Francis of Assisi. Founded by Saint Pedro Bautista on February 17, 1590, it was meant to be a place of solitude or "retreat" nestled atop a hill. The present Santuario de San Pedro Bautista was the first structure in the area.

Today, it is a heavily populated industrial district with factories mostly located along Judge Juan Luna Street. Two national roads are found in this area, namely Roosevelt and Del Monte Avenues.

It extended beyond Projects 7 and 8 as well as Timog Avenue area. Currently, it is composed of Barangays Damayan, Mariblo, Masambong, Paltok, Paraiso and San Antonio.

Patron saint 
The patron saint of Barangay San Antonio is Anthony of Padua whose feast day, the entire community celebrates every 13 June.

Demography 
As of the 2020 census of the Philippine Statistics Authority, the population of Barangay San Antonio went down to 22,229 from 24,667 5 years prior.

Basic services 
The newly elected barangay officials headed by Punong Barangay Nestor Berroya have appropriated funds for the purchase of a new fire truck for the use of their constituents.

Barangay and Sangguniang Kabataan officials

List of Punong Barangay

Members of Sangguniang Barangay

The current Barangay Captain, the Barangay Kagawads and SK Council were elected on May 14, 2018.

Typhoon Ondoy/Typhoon Ketsana
Barangay San Antonio was one of the hardest-hit barangay in Quezon City by Typhoon Ondoy.  The level of floodwaters from Halang Creek and a nearby stream reached as high as 30 feet especially in the areas such as West Riverside Street, Santiago Street, Guerrero Street, and Fernandez Streets. Many houses were destroyed by raging floodwaters and countless properties were damaged.  The barangay council temporarily used the barangay covered court in San Jose Street as well as the Sinag-Tala Elementary School as an evacuation area.  Massive relief operations for almost 2,000 affected families was launched in order to help the victims of the flooding.  One drowning casualty was recorded/reported.

References

Quezon City
Barangays of Quezon City
Barangays of Metro Manila